Tomorrow, on April 3rd... is a 1969 Soviet comedy film directed by Igor Maslennikov.

Plot 
The film takes place in one school in Leningrad, whose students decided to declare April 2nd  Day of Truth. The truth must always be told, but it does not free us from the need to be sensitive, delicate, attentive to each other. To be truthful means to be fair, kind, a real person.

Cast 
 Eneken Aksel  as Ariadna Nikolaevna (voiced by Marina Neyolova)
 Lyudmila Volynskaya	as Lyudmila Petrovna, teacher of literature
 Viktor Ilichyov as Stanislav Petrovich
 Pavel Luspekayev as Ferapontov
 Aleksandr Demyanenko	as police lieutenant
 Vyacheslav Goroshenkov as Vova Ryashentsev
 Natalia Danilova	as 	Masha Gavrikova
 Larisa Malevannaya as Masha Gavrikova's mother
 Yevgeni Malyantsev as Yura Fonarev
 Vladimir Pirozhkov as  Kolyan
 Konstantin Raikin as high school joker

References

External links 
 

1969 films
1960s Russian-language films
Soviet comedy films
1969 comedy films
Films directed by Igor Maslennikov
Soviet teen films
Lenfilm films